Las Cuevas is a Research Station and Explorers Lodge in the heart of the
Chiquibul Tropical Moist Forest, at 550 m altitude in the Maya Mountains of Belize in Central America. It is an important centre for biological research established jointly by the Forest Department of Belize and the Natural History Museum, London in 1994. In May 1995 venturers from the charity Raleigh International built a 30-foot tower to help Ornithologists study flight paths in the area and watch out for forest fires. It is located close to the mouth of a large cave an ancient Mayan temple complex and Monkey Tail River which runs through Virgin rainforest.  Las Cuevas Research Station is located in Tropical Broadleaf Deciduous vegetation as described by Penn et al (2004) and is underlain by limestone dominated geology, which influences the high regional variations in vegetation classes across the Chiquibul.

References

Populated places in Cayo District